Mitchell J. Chang is a Professor of Higher Education and Organizational Change and Asian American Studies (by courtesy) at the University of California, Los Angeles. From March 2018- February 2022, Chang served as the Editor in Chief of The Journal of Higher Education.On July 1, 2022, he began an appointment as Associate Vice Chancellor of Equity, Diversity, and Inclusion at UCLA.

Early life and education
Born in Taiwan, Chang immigrated to San Jose, California in 1971, where his father pursued a career in Silicon Valley. He and his family are beneficiaries of the Fair Housing Act, Title VIII of the Civil Rights Act of 1968, which made it illegal to practice housing discrimination. He noted that this federal legislation made exposure to diversity an “inescapable reality” for him and his family, but racism was still very present.

Upon matriculating at the University of California, Santa Barbara, Chang was exposed to ethnic studies and the broader diversity of the university, which helped him understand better the educational implications of his childhood exposure to a wide range of racial and cultural differences. This continued at Harvard University and the University of California, Los Angeles (UCLA), where Chang also examined issues informed by his work in the San Jose public school system and by the national controversy over affirmative action. His UCLA doctoral dissertation was one of the first studies to test former U.S. Supreme Court Justice Lewis Powell’s claims about the educational benefits of exposure to racial diversity in his opinion on the case Regents of the Univ. of Cal. v. Bakke 438 U.S. 265 (1978), which is often referred to as the diversity rationale for justifying race conscious admissions practices in U.S. higher education.

Career
Chang's research focuses on the educational efficacy of diversity-related initiatives on college campuses and how to apply those best practices toward advancing student learning and democratizing institutions. He has written over one hundred publications, some of which were cited in the U.S. Supreme Court ruling of Grutter v. Bollinger, one of two cases involving the use of race sensitive admissions practices at the University of Michigan. Chang received a National Academy of Education/Spencer Foundation Fellowship in 2001 and was awarded the Outstanding Outcomes Assessment Research Award, 1999-2000 by the American College Personnel Association for conducting one of the first studies to document empirically the positive educational impact of racial diversity on students’ learning and college experiences. In 2006, he was profiled as one of the nation's top ten scholars by Diverse: Issues in Higher Education and in 2008, he and his co-researchers received the ACPA Asian Pacific American Network Outstanding Contribution to APIDA Research Award. Chang has also served in elected positions for both the American Educational Research Association (At-Large Member of AERA Executive Council & Division J), which inducted him as a Fellow in 2016, and the Association for the Study of Higher Education (Board of Directors), which awarded him the Founder's Service Award in 2014 and the Research Achievement Award in 2020. He has served on many national advisory panels, including for the U.S. Department of Education, White House Domestic Policy Council, National Science Foundation, National Institute of Health, and College Board, and was the Editor in Chief for The Journal of Higher Education. Chang previously worked as Associate Dean at Loyola Marymount University, where he helped to supervise the structuring and teaching of the undergraduate diversity course requirement and as a school evaluator at the Alum Rock Elementary School District in San Jose, where he oversaw the achievement testing program

References

External links
 UCLA GSEIS Faculty Profile

University of California, Los Angeles faculty
Loyola Marymount University faculty
Living people
University of California, Los Angeles alumni
Academic journal editors
Taiwanese emigrants to the United States
University of California, Santa Barbara alumni
Harvard Graduate School of Education alumni
1965 births